Manga is an African surname that may refer to the following notable people:

Sport
Alberto Manga (born 1980), Spanish football midfielder.
Ben Manga (born 1974), Equatoguinean football scout and former player 
Bruno Ecuele Manga (born 1988), Gabonese football player
 Carol Manga (born ), Cameroonian rugby player who co-founded the Cameroon Rugby League XIII in 2012
David Manga (born 1989), Central African football player
Franck Manga Guela (born 1986), Ivorian football midfielder
Jean Manga Onguéné (born 1946), Cameroonian football centre-forward
Tabi Manga (born 1994), Cameroonian football defender

Other
 Bébé Manga (1948–2011), Cameroonian singer
Michael Manga (born 1968), Canadian-American geoscientist 
Rudolf Duala Manga Bell (1873–1914), Duala king and resistance leader in Cameroon